Alex Elmsley (2 March 1929 – 8 January 2006) was a Scottish magician and computer programmer. He was notable for his invention of the Ghost Count or Elmsley Count, creating mathematical card tricks, and for publishing on the mathematics of playing card shuffling.

He began practising magic in 1946, as a teenager. He studied physics and mathematics at Cambridge University; whilst there he was also secretary of the Pentacle Club. He was a patent agent, and later a computer expert, in his day job. Otherwise, he was an amateur card and close-up magician. He was awarded an Academy of Magical Arts Creative Fellowship in 1972.

He created a number of well-known magic tricks, including The Four Card Trick, Between Your Palms, Point Of Departure and Diamond Cut Diamond.

In 1975 he briefly toured the US giving a highly praised lecture known as the "Dazzle Card Act", which consisted of a magic act followed by a detailed discussion of routining. Notes on the lecture were released under the title Cardwork. Elmsley was the subject of The Collected Works of Alex Elmsley (vol. 1 1991, vol. 2 1994).

He named the special count used in The Four Card Trick the ghost count, though it would later become known as the Elmsley Count.

References

Notes

External links
Elmsley on Magicdirectory.com
Elmsley from Magicweek.co.uk

British magicians
1929 births
2006 deaths
Academy of Magical Arts Creative Fellowship winners
Academy of Magical Arts Lifetime Achievement Fellowship winners